Leonidovka is a rural locality (a selo) in Karatovsky Selsoviet, Tuymazinsky District, Bashkortostan, Russia. The population was 25 as of 2010. There are 3 streets.

Geography 
Leonidovka is located 36 km southwest of Tuymazy (the district's administrative centre) by road. Imangulovo is the nearest rural locality.

References 

Rural localities in Tuymazinsky District